The Methylococcaceae are a family of bacteria that obtain their carbon and energy from methane, called methanotrophs.

They comprise the type I methanotrophs, in contrast to the Methylocystaceae or type II methanotrophs. They belong to Gammaproteobacteria, and are typically given their own order.

The Methylococcaceae have internal membranes in the form of flattened discs, perpendicular to the cell wall. Methane is oxidized to give formaldehyde, which is fixed by a process called the ribulose monophosphate (RuMP) cycle. Here formaldehyde is combined with sugar ribulose, producing hexulose.  This, in turn, is broken down to produce glyceraldehyde, which is used to produce new ribulose and other organic compounds.  Catabolism does not involve a complete citric acid cycle.

Some species of the Methylococcaceae have formed with certain marine mussels endosymbiotic relationships.

References

External links
 Methylococcaceae J.P. Euzéby: List of Prokaryotic names with Standing in Nomenclature

Gammaproteobacteria